Dalit is an ancient designation for a group of indigenous Indian people. Several influential Hindu saints, though, were members of this group. Though there has also many historical Vedic period saints, whose descendents are now considered as Dalits. Many of the saints have been classified as Shudra or Avarna, because there was no concept of Dalits or Harijan.

List

Vedic period 
 Matanga, teacher of Shabari.
 Valmiki, author of Ramayana and teacher of Lava and Kusha.

Ancient period 
 Avvaiyar, royal saint of Chera dynasty.
 Nandanar (Nalai Povar), one of the Nayanars.

Medieval period 
 Chokhamela, one of the first Dalit poets in India and wrote many Abhangas.
 Ghasidas, notable saint of Satnami sect.
 Namdev, saint from Varkari tradition.
 Ravidas, founder of Ravidassia religion.

Modern period 
 Mata Amritanandamayi
 Bhagu, notable Hindu saint and wrote many Abhangas devoted to Viṭhal.
 Parsuram, founder of Ramnami Samaj.
 Vitthal Ramji Shinde

See also 

 List of Dalits

References

Sources 
 
 
 
 

 
Lists of Hindu religious leaders